Clostridium jeddahense is a Gram-positive bacterium from the genus Clostridium which has been isolated from human faeces in Saudi Arabia.

References

 

Bacteria described in 2016
jeddahense